The 1949 Cupa României Final was the 12th final of Romania's most prestigious football cup competition. It was disputed between CSCA București and CSU Cluj, and was won by CSCA București after a game with 3 goals. It was the first cup title in the history of CSCA București.

Match details

See also 
List of Cupa României finals

References

External links
Romaniansoccer.ro

1949
Cupa
Romania